John Edward McCarthy (born 20 January 1964) is a mathematician. He is currently the Spencer T. Olin Professor of Arts and Sciences, and
chair of the Department of Mathematics and Statistics at Washington University in St. Louis. He works in operator theory
and several complex variables.

He received a B.A. from Trinity College Dublin in 1983, and a Ph.D. from the University of California, Berkeley in 1989. His Ph.D. Advisor was Donald Sarason.

He has worked on Toeplitz operators, spaces of holomorphic functions, Nevanlinna–Pick interpolation, extension theorems in several complex variables, and the mathematics of ultrasound. In 1995, he, Sheldon Axler and Donald Sarason co-chaired a program at the Mathematical Sciences Research Institute in Holomorphic Spaces.  Jim Agler and he wrote the text Pick Interpolation and Hilbert Function Spaces.

Honors include the Gilbert de Beauregard Robinson award in 2016 from the Canadian Mathematical Society and being elected a Fellow of the American Mathematical Society in 2018.

Books
 (with Sheldon Axler, and Donald Sarason) editors. Holomorphic Spaces, Cambridge University Press 1998
 (with Jim Agler) Pick Interpolation and Hilbert function spaces, American Mathematical Society 2002
 (with Bob A. Dumas) Transition to Higher Mathematics: Structure and Proof, 1st ed. McGraw Hill 2006; 2nd. ed. Washington University Open Scholarship, 2015

References

External links
 McCarthy's Home Page
 
 Google scholar profile

Living people
American mathematicians
Irish mathematicians
British mathematicians
Alumni of Trinity College Dublin
UC Berkeley College of Letters and Science alumni
Washington University in St. Louis faculty
Washington University in St. Louis mathematicians
Fellows of the American Mathematical Society
1964 births